Radiation colitis is injury to the colon caused by radiation therapy.   It is usually associated with treatment for prostate cancer or cervical cancer.  Common symptoms are diarrhea, a feeling of being unable to empty the bowel, gastrointestinal bleeding, and abdominal pain.

If symptoms of radiation colitis onset within 60 days of exposure to radiation, it is referred to as acute; otherwise, it is classified as chronic.  Acute radiation colitis may onset within a few hours of radiation exposure, and may clear up within two or three months after radiation ends. Between 5 and 15% of individuals who receive radiation to the pelvis may have chronic radiation colitis. Radiation therapy can also affect the bowel at the small intestine (radiation enteritis) or the rectum (radiation proctitis).

References 

Gastrointestinal tract disorders
Diarrhea
Diseases of intestines
Radiation therapy
Colitis